Jerome Johnson may refer to:
Edgar Augustus Jerome Johnson (1900 – 1972), American economist
Jerome L. Johnson (born 1935), retired United States Navy four star admiral
Jerome Johnson (American football) (born 1985), American football fullback
Jerome Johnson (Brookside)

See also
Jerry Johnson (disambiguation)